Fictibacillus enclensis is a Gram-positive, strictly aerobic, spore-forming and motile bacterium from the genus of Fictibacillus which has been isolated from marine sediments from the Chorão Island in India.

References

External links 

Type strain of Fictibacillus enclensis at BacDive -  the Bacterial Diversity Metadatabase

Bacillaceae
Bacteria described in 2014